Štefan Biró (12 April 1913 – 14 March 1954) was a Slovak footballer who played as a forward and appeared for both the Czechoslovakia and Slovakia national teams.

Career
Biró earned his first and only cap for Czechoslovakia on 3 April 1938 in the 1936–38 Central European International Cup against Switzerland, which finished as a 0–4 loss in Basel. He later represented the Slovakia national team, making his first appearance on 3 December 1939 in a friendly match against Germany, which finished as a 1–3 loss in Chemnitz. He was capped eight times for Slovakia, making his final appearance on 22 November 1942 in a friendly against Germany, in which he scored his only international goal. The match in Bratislava finished as a 2–5 loss.

Personal life
Biró died on 14 March 1954 at the age of 40.

Career statistics

International

International goals

References

General references

External links
 
 

1913 births
1954 deaths
Czechoslovak footballers
Czechoslovakia international footballers
Slovak footballers
Slovakia international footballers
Dual internationalists (football)
Association football forwards
FK Náchod players
FC Fastav Zlín players
ŠK Slovan Bratislava players
Czechoslovak First League players